David Martin (born March 15, 1959) is a former gridiron football cornerback who played in the National Football League (NFL), the Canadian Football League (CFL) and the United States Football League (USFL). He played college football at Villanova.

Early life and high school
Martin was born and grew up in Philadelphia, Pennsylvania and attended John Bartram High School. He was named to the Philadelphia Public League's All-Decade football team for the 1970s by the Philadelphia Daily News.

College career
Martin was a member of the Villanova Wildcats for four seasons. He tied for the team lead with four interceptions as a sophomore. He finished his collegiate career with ten interceptions and returned 31 punts for 387 yards and two touchdowns and 16 kickoffs for 302 yards.

Professional career
Martin was selected in the ninth round of the 1981 NFL Draft by the Detroit Lions, but was cut during training camp. He was signed in by the Denver Gold of the newly formed United States Football League (USFL) in 1983 and was named All-USFL in his first season after intercepting six passes. Martin was named All-USFL as both a defensive back and as a punt returner 1984. Martin was traded to the Arizona Outlaws during the 1985 season and was again named All-USFL. 

Martin began the 1986 season with the San Diego Chargers and played in four games with the team before being released. He was signed by the Montreal Alouettes of the Canadian Football League (CFL) and spent the rest of 1986 with the team. Martin became a free agent when Montreal suspended team operations and was signed by the Buffalo Bills on July 27, 1987. Martin was cut at the end of training camp, but was re-signed by the Bills in October 1987 as a replacement player during the 1987 NFL players strike, recording a sack in three games played before being released after the strike ended.

References

1959 births
Living people
American football cornerbacks
John Bartram High School alumni
Villanova Wildcats football players
Players of American football from Philadelphia
Denver Gold players
Detroit Lions players
Arizona Outlaws players
Montreal Alouettes players
Buffalo Bills players
San Diego Chargers players
Players of Canadian football from Philadelphia
National Football League replacement players